Equivalent canonization or equipollent canonization (Latin: equipollens canonizatio) is a form of canonization that occurs when the Pope recognizes and orders the public and universal veneration of a Servant of God, without having gone through the procedure normally required by formal canonization, because veneration of the saint has been carried out since ancient times and continuously by the Church.

History 
Veneration of Christian martyrs and saints are attested from the first centuries of the Church. However, canonization as an ecclesiastical procedure was not outlined until the 11th century with the aim of seeking to define those Christians who would deserve the universal reverence of the Church, thus avoiding confusion between local churches and seeking that the virtues of the deceased were fully proven. Already during this time the authority of the Bishop of Rome was appealed to claim to him or to the synods the power to determine said cult.

In the 17th century, Pope Urban VIII began to make pontifical declarations of canonization through papal bulls, the first canonized saints being Philip Neri, Ignatius of Loyola, Francis Xavier  and in other bulls he would decree the beatification of other servants of God, Similarly, in 1634, through the bull Caelestis Hierusalem cives, he established such powers of beatification and canonization as exclusive to the Holy See.

In the first half of the 18th century, Bishop Prospero Lambertini, before being elected as pope under the name of Benedict XIV, published his maximum liturgical work entitled De servorum Dei beatificatione et de beatorum canonizatione, where he expounded the doctrine of "equivalent canonization" and described the possibility of establishing public worship for a person whose reputation for holiness and heroic virtues has long been proven by tradition and for whom there was already a prior worship in the Church.

This doctrine has been reiterated since then by various pontiffs up to modernity without the most recent provisions regarding the canonization process having repealed it as a valid practice, exclusive to the Pope.

Various saints have been included in the martyrology in this way, including Romuald, Norbert of Xanten, Bruno of Cologne, Peter Nolasco, Raymond Nonnatus, John of Matha, Felix of Valois, Margaret of Scotland, Stephen I of Hungary, and Pope Gregory VII. Some of the most recent cases of equivalent canonization were that of Hildegard of Bingen on 10 May 2012, 833 years after her death; that of Angela of Foligno on 9 October 2013, 704 years after her death; that of Peter Faber on 17 December 2013, 467 years after his death; and that of Joseph of Anchieta on 3 April 2014, 416 years after his death.

Requirements 
Unlike ordinary canonization, in which a whole canonical process is necessary, in equivalent canonization only the prior verification of:

 Public veneration of the servant of God carried out historically and without interruption.
 The fame of holiness and miraculous intercession.
 Heroic virtues or martyrdom.

After the above, only a public declaration of the Supreme Pontiff is enough where the extension of the cult of the saint to the Universal Church is ordered.

Complete list

As examples, prior to his pontificate, of this mode of canonization, Pope Benedict XIV himself enumerated the equipollent canonizations of saints:
 Romuald - 9 July 1595
 Norbert - 7 September 1621
 Bruno - 6 October 1623
 Pope Gregory VII - 25 September 1728
 Duke Wenceslaus of Bohemia - 14 March 1729
 Gertrude of Helfta - 20 July 1738.

Later equipollent canonizations include those of saints:
 Peter Damian - 1 October 1828
 Vibiana - February 1854
 Cyril and Methodius - 30 September 1880
 Cyril of Alexandria, Cyril of Jerusalem, Justin Martyr and Augustine of Canterbury - 28 July 1882
 John of Damascus and Sylvester Gozzolini - 29 August 1890
 Bede the Venerable - 25 May 1899
 Ephrem the Syrian - 5 October 1920
 Albert the Great - 15 December 1931
 John Fisher and Thomas More - 19 May 1935
 Gregorio Barbarigo - 26 May 1960
 Meinhard of Livonia - 8 September 1993
 Hildegard of Bingen - 10 May 2012

Pope Francis added saints:
 Angela of Foligno - 9 October 2013
 Peter Faber - 17 December 2013
 José de Anchieta - 3 April 2014
 Marie of the Incarnation - 3 April 2014
 Francis-Xavier de Montmorency-Laval - 3 April 2014
 Joseph Vaz - 14 January 2015
 Bartholomew of Braga - 5 July 2019
 Margaret of Castello - 24 April 2021

References

Canonization
Canon law of the Catholic Church
Christian practices
Christian saints
Christian terminology